Moat Farm Meadows is a  biological Site of Special Scientific Interest north-east of Otley in Suffolk.

These calcareous meadows are traditionally cut for hay. They have diverse flora, with many green-winged orchids and one of the largest populations in the county of meadow saffron. Other species include ox-eye daisy and cuckoo flower.

The site is private land with no public access.

References

Sites of Special Scientific Interest in Suffolk